The Spanish Senior Open was a golf tournament on the over fifties men's professional European Seniors Tour. It was first played in 1994, which was the tour's third season, at La Manga Club in Murcia but was cancelled after one year. The tournament was revived in 2005 and played at the Club de Campo del Mediterráneo near Castellón de la Plana, Castellón, Spain. In 2007 the prize fund was €325,000. In 2008 the Seniors Tour Championship moved to Club de Campo del Mediterráneo and was called the "OKI Castellón Open España - Senior Tour Championship".

Winners

References

External links
Coverage on the European Senior Tour's official site
Coverage of 2005 event on the European Senior Tour's official site

Former European Senior Tour events
Golf tournaments in Spain
Recurring sporting events established in 1994
Recurring sporting events disestablished in 2007
Defunct sports competitions in Spain